The Suontaka sword was found in what was previously interpreted as a high-status woman's grave at Suontaka Vesitorninmäki, Tyrväntö, Finland in 1968. Based on a study published in 2021, the sword was likely hidden in the grave some time after the burial. The grave dates from the late Nordic Iron Age,  1040–1174 AD, and it also included another hiltless sword with silver-inlays that was placed directly on the buried corpse. Ancient DNA analysis found that the individual likely had Klinefelter syndrome, indicated through the presence of XXY chromosomes. The individual had been buried in a female dress with three brooches. According to the authors of the 2021 study, "The overall context of the grave indicates that it was a respected person whose gender identity may well have been nonbinary."

The bronze-hilted sword was made with grip and hilt entirely in hollow cast bronze. The sword is considered to be a unique work of art for its time.

Suontaka village is in Häme, Finland. This area of Häme is known for its numerous sword-findings and archaeological sites. The time during which the sword was in use was a prosperous yet violent time in the Häme region. The original sword is in display in the National Museum of Finland.

References

External links
 Sword Found in a Woman's Grave in Suontaka Finland, Sword-Site
 KM17777:1 at the Finnish Heritage Agency

11th century in Europe
Archaeological discoveries in Finland
History of Kanta-Häme
Individual weapons
Inscriptions in unknown languages
Medieval European swords
Medieval Finland
Non-binary gender